Alphonse Allain (21 December 1924 – 20 June 2022) was a French poet who wrote in the Norman language.

Biography
Eleven of his poems were converted into songs performed by Daniel Bourdelès on the CD , produced in 2008. He remained active in poetry into old age, supported by local media on the Cotentin Peninsula.

Alphonse Allain died on 20 June 2022 at the age of 97.

References

1924 births
2022 deaths
French poets
French fabulists
Norman-language poets